Israel–Libya relations describe the relations between Israel and Libya. There have been no diplomatic relations between Israel and Libya since Libya's independence.

History 
In the years before the declaration of Libya's independence (in 1951), there was an extensive operation to bring Libyan Jews to Israel, Israeli representatives stayed in Tripoli and conducted aliyah operations there, aliyah activists obtained the consent of the country's leaders to continue their activities provided they served as Jewish Agency emissaries. The Israeli government, however, after Libya's independence, closed the Ministry of Aliyah, expelled the activists and did not allow Israeli ships to visit its ports.

In a 1951 vote at the United Nations on the accession of Libya to the Organization, Israel voted in favor and thus decided in favor of its admission to the United Nations, but a few years later Libya joined the Arab League and the Arab boycott of Israel and was among the leaders of the opposing Israeli voice.  After the Six-Day War, France imposed an embargo on Israel, thus supplying 50 Mirage 5 aircraft, developed in cooperation with Israel, to Libya instead of to Israel.

In February 1973, the Israeli Air Force shot down a passenger plane Libyan Arab Airlines Flight 114 in the lobby. The plane's interception occurred after it accidentally penetrated Israeli airspace over northern Sinai Peninsula, an area that was under Israeli control at the time. As a result of the plane crash, 108 passengers and crew were killed.

During the Yom Kippur War, Libyan leader Muammar Gaddafi sent a large sending force to Egypt in order to assist it in its war against Israel. The Expeditionary Force included armored forces, artillery and 2 Mirage 5 squadrons that took an active part in the fighting on the southern front. When Libyan President Muammar Gaddafi realized that King Hussein of Jordan had rejected requests by Arab leaders to join the war and attack Israel from the east, he began to insult him and called on the Jordanian people to revolt and join the war on their own.

In 1976, Libya assisted in the hijacking of an Air France passenger plane by allowing the aircraft to refuel in Benghazi. The hijackers were eliminated and the passengers of the plane were released in Operation Entebbe. In 1977, Gaddafi sharply attacked Egypt, which was then in talks with Israel for a possible peace agreement, and saw it as an Egyptian violation of the Khartoum Conference Declaration. Against the background of the developing relationship with Israel, Libya initiated hostilities with the aim of undermining the rule of Egypt, which escalated into a war between Libya and Egypt.

In 1993, as a gesture aimed at improving ties with Israel, Gaddafi sent a delegation of 192 Libya pilgrims to Jerusalem, though the trip was ultimately cut short after the pilgrims expressed criticism of Israel during their trip. It was reported that Gaddafi himself wished to visit Israel at the time, with Israeli Prime Minister Yitzhak Rabin and Israeli Foreign Minister Shimon Peres initially stating that he would be welcome.

During the 2000s, Libya promoted the Isratin peace proposal, which would involve a binational state including both Jews and Palestinians.

In 2007, Israeli President Shimon Peres reportedly expressed interest in having Gaddafi mediate peace talks with the Palestinians in Jordan. However, although Gaddafi agreed to take part, he made his participation conditional upon breaking Israel–Jordan relations should the talks fail and be leaked to the media, which were unacceptable terms to Jordan.

In 2011, Saif al-Islam Gaddafi conducted talks on behalf of Libya with Israeli minister Ayoob Kara regarding Libyan recognition of Israel, including assistance with securing the release of Gilad Shalit from Hamas custody and a visit by Gaddafi to Israel, though these talks did not conclude due to the overthrow of the Gaddafi government during the First Libyan Civil War. It was later reported by Haaretz that Saif al-Islam had maintained informal dialogue with Israel during the Libyan Arab Jamahiriya on "diplomatic and humanitarian issues".

In December 2019, during the Second Libyan Civil War, Libyan Foreign Minister Khalifa Hafter said he expressed hope for a normalization of Israel-Libya relations. In June 2020, Libyan Deputy Prime Minister Abdul Salam al-Badri said that his country was not an enemy of Israel, and never had been.

In January 2022, Abdul Hamid Dbeibeh, the Prime Minister of the Libyan Government of National Unity, denied reports that he had met with Mossad in Jordan to discuss normalisation of relations. He had previously stated that Libya could only decide on establishing relations with Israel after democratic elections had been held in Libya.

References 

 
Libya
Bilateral relations of Libya